David or Dave Keane may refer to:

 David Keane (judge) (born 1964), Irish judge
 David Keane (politician), English politician
 Dave Keane (born 1956), Irish hurler
 Dave Keane (illustrator), American author and illustrator

See also
 David McKean (disambiguation)